PopStar Guitar is a music game for the Wii and PlayStation 2 developed by British studio Broadsword Interactive and published by XS Games.

Gameplay
In PopStar Guitar, players embark on a journey as a budding guitarist with aspirations of becoming the ultimate pop music sensation. Throughout the game, players develop skills to help them achieve their goal of success on the main stage of a worldwide Battle of the Bands competition, which will bring them international stardom.

The career mode will see the player starting as a member of a garage band before touring across the 25 different in game venues before performing at the Battle Of The Bands. The game features 12 playable characters (6 male/6 female) to choose from, and players are able to customize their look and the instruments they play.

The game is played similar to other music games with players trying to press buttons as they follow scrolling notes onscreen. The PlayStation 2 version supports guitar controllers for play, while the Wii version will come packaged with one AirG controller shell allowing players to play air guitar-style using only the Wii Remote and Nunchuk.

Soundtrack
The game features a line-up of 60 songs, which includes original mastered tracks from pop and rock artists. These songs include:

Reception
IGN called the Wii version of the game "a wholly unnecessary piece of shovelware" that was "clunky, fugly" and with a "bottom-of-the-barrel" soundtrack, though they believed the AirG peripheral worked well. They gave it 3.5/10.

See also
 Rock Band
 Guitar Hero
 Rock Revolution
 Ultimate Band

References

External links
PopStar Guitar trailer at Eurogamer
PopStar Guitar at IGN

2008 video games
Cooperative video games
Guitar video games
PlayStation 2 games
Video games developed in the United Kingdom
Wii games
XS Games games
Multiplayer and single-player video games
Broadsword Interactive games